Citizen Kay is an Australian Canberra-based hip hop artist.

Citizen Kay's EP Demokracy was nominated for ARIA Award for Best Urban Album at the ARIA Music Awards of 2015.

Citizen Kay's debut album, With the People, was nominated the next year.

Biography
Kojo Owusu-Ansah was born in Ghana and moved to Australia (in 2000) when he was six. He is the older brother of Genesis Owusu.

He released this single, "YES!" in 2013 and followed it up the next year with an EP called Demokracy, released in November 2014.  The EP was nominated for Best Urban Album at the ARIAs and Best Independent Hip-Hop Album Release at the AIR Awards of 2015.

In October 2015 he released his debut album With the People

Citizen Kay released Belly of the Beast in August 2017.

Discography

Albums

Extended plays

Singles

Awards

AIR Awards
The Australian Independent Record Awards (commonly known informally as AIR Awards) is an annual awards night to recognise, promote and celebrate the success of Australia's Independent Music sector.

|-
| AIR Awards of 2015
|Demokracy 
| Best Independent Hip Hop/Urban Album
| 
|-

ARIA Music Awards
The ARIA Music Awards is an annual awards ceremony that recognises excellence, innovation, and achievement across all genres of Australian music.

|-
| 2015
|Demokracy 
| Best Urban Album
| 
|-
| 2016
|With The People 
| Best Urban Album
| 
|-

National Live Music Awards
The National Live Music Awards (NLMAs) are a broad recognition of Australia's diverse live industry, celebrating the success of the Australian live scene. The awards commenced in 2016.

|-
| National Live Music Awards of 2016
| themselves 
| ACT Live Voice of the Year
| 
|-
| National Live Music Awards of 2017
| themselves 
| Live Hip Hop Act of the Year
| 
|-
| National Live Music Awards of 2020
| themselves 
| ACT Act Voice of the Year
| 
|-

References

Australian hip hop musicians
Musicians from Canberra
Living people
Year of birth missing (living people)
People from Koforidua